Charles Leonard Thornton-Duesbury (3 February 186711 March 1928) was an Anglican bishop who served as the Bishop of Sodor and Man from 1925 until his death in 1928.

Thornton-Duesbury was a native of the Isle of Man and educated at Trinity College, Dublin. Ordained in 1891, his first post was as a curate at St George's-in-the-East, London. He then held incumbencies at St Mark's Barrow-in-Furness, St Peter's Islington and St Mary's Leyton and finally (before his ordination to the episcopate).

References

1867 births
Alumni of Trinity College Dublin
Manx Anglican priests
20th-century Church of England bishops
Bishops of Sodor and Man
1928 deaths
Deans of Peel
Manx religious leaders